Non-philosophy (French: non-philosophie) is a concept developed by French Continental philosopher François Laruelle (formerly of the Collège international de philosophie and the University of Paris X: Nanterre).

Non-philosophy according to Laruelle
Laruelle argues that all forms of philosophy (from ancient philosophy to analytic philosophy to deconstruction and so on) are structured around a prior decision, and remain constitutively blind to this decision. The 'decision' that Laruelle is concerned with here is the dialectical splitting of the world in order to grasp the world philosophically. Examples from the history of philosophy include Immanuel Kant's distinction between the synthesis of manifold impressions and the faculties of the understanding; Martin Heidegger's split between the ontic and the ontological; and Jacques Derrida's notion of différance/presence. The reason Laruelle finds this decision interesting and problematic is because the decision itself cannot be grasped (philosophically grasped, that is) without introducing some further scission.

Laruelle further argues that the decisional structure of philosophy can only be grasped non-philosophically. In this sense, non-philosophy is a science of philosophy. Non-philosophy is not metaphilosophy because, as Laruelle scholar Ray Brassier notes, "philosophy is already metaphilosophical through its constitutive reflexivity". Brassier also defines non-philosophy as the "theoretical practice of philosophy proceeding by way of transcendental axioms and producing theorems which are philosophically uninterpretable". The reason why the axioms and theorems of non-philosophy are philosophically uninterpretable is because, as explained, philosophy cannot grasp its decisional structure in the way that non-philosophy can.

Laruelle's non-philosophy, he claims, should be considered to philosophy what non-Euclidean geometry is to the work of Euclid. It stands in particular opposition to philosophical heirs of Jacques Lacan such as Alain Badiou.

Laruelle scholar Ekin Erkan, elucidating on Laruelle's system, notes that "'non-philosophy' [...] withdraws from the metaphysical precept of separating the world into binarisms, perhaps epitomized by the formative division between 'universals” and “particulars' in Kant’s Transcendental Deduction. Laruelle’s method also rejects the 'evental' nature of Being described by Heiddegger [...] Laruelle's  'One' is understood as generic identity - an identity/commonality that reverses the classical metaphysics found in philosophy’s bastion thinkers (a lineage that runs from Plato to Badiou), where the transcendental is upheld as a necessary precondition for grounding reality.""

Role of the subject
The decisional structure of philosophy is grasped by the subject of non-philosophy. Laruelle's concept of "the subject" here is not the same as the subject-matter, nor does it have anything to do with the traditional philosophical notion of subjectivity. It is, instead, a function along the same lines as a mathematical function.

The concept of performativity (taken from speech act theory) is central to the idea of the subject of non-philosophy. Laruelle believes that both philosophy and non-philosophy are performative. However, philosophy merely performatively legitimates the decisional structure which, as already noted, it is unable to fully grasp, in contrast to non-philosophy which collapses the distinction (present in philosophy) between theory and action. In this sense, non-philosophy is radically performative because the theorems deployed in accordance with its method constitute fully-fledged scientific actions. Non-philosophy, then, is conceived as a rigorous and scholarly discipline.

The role of the subject is a critical facet of Laruelle's non-ethics and Laruelle's political system. "By problematizing what he terms 'The Statist Ideal,' or the 'Unitary Illusion' - be it negative (Hegel) or positive (Nietzsche) - Laruelle interrogates the 'scission' of the minority subject, which he contends is a “symptom” of the Western dialectic practice. In opposition to the Kantian first principles upon which both Continental and Analytic philosophy rest, Laruelle attempts to sketch a 'real Critique of Reason' that is determined in itself and through itself; insofar as this involves Laruellean 'non-ethics,' this involves breaking from the long-situated practice of studying the State from the paralogism of the State view, itself."

Radical immanence
The radically performative character of the subject of non-philosophy would be meaningless without the concept of radical immanence. The philosophical doctrine of immanence is generally defined as any philosophical belief or argument which resists transcendent separation between the world and some other principle or force (such as a creator deity). According to Laruelle, the decisional character of philosophy makes immanence impossible for it, as some ungraspable splitting is always taking place within. By contrast, non-philosophy axiomatically deploys immanence as being endlessly conceptualizable by the subject of non-philosophy. This is what Laruelle means by "radical immanence". The actual work of the subject of non-philosophy is to apply its methods to the decisional resistance to radical immanence which is found in philosophy.

Sans-philosophie 
In "A New Presentation of Non-Philosophy" (2004), François Laruelle states:
 

Numbered amongst the early members or sympathizers of sans-philosophie ("without philosophy") are those included in a collection published in 2005 by L’Harmattan: François Laruelle, Jason Barker, Ray Brassier, Laurent Carraz, Hugues Choplin, Jacques Colette, Nathalie Depraz, Oliver Feltham, Gilles Grelet, Jean-Pierre Faye, Gilbert Hottois, Jean-Luc Rannou, Pierre A. Riffard, Sandrine Roux and Jordanco Sekulovski. Since then, a slew of translations and new introductions have appeared from John Ó Maoilearca (Mullarkey), Anthony Paul Smith, Rocco Gangle, Katerina Kolozova, and Alexander Galloway.

Precursors
Adam Karl August von Eschenmayer also developed an approach to philosophy called non-philosophy.

He defined it as a kind of mystical illumination by which was obtained a belief in God that could not be reached by mere intellectual effort. He carried this tendency to mysticism into his physical researches, and was led by it to take a deep interest in the phenomena of animal magnetism. He ultimately became a devout believer in demoniacal and spiritual possession; and his later writings are all strongly impregnated with supernaturalism.

Laruelle sees Eschenmayer's doctrine as a "break with philosophy and its systematic aspect in the name of passion, faith, and feeling".

See also
 Antiphilosophy
 Henology
 Nondualism
 Félix Ravaisson-Mollien—Laruelle wrote a book on him in 1971

References

Further reading
 Brassier, Ray, 'Axiomatic Heresy: The Non-Philosophy of Francois Laruelle', Radical Philosophy 121, Sep/Oct 2003.
 Brassier, Ray, Nihil Unbound. Enlightenment and Extinction. Edinburgh University Press, 2007.
 Galloway, Alexander, Laruelle: Against the Digital. University of Minnesota Press, 2014.
 Gangle, Rocco. François Laruelle’s Philosophies of Difference: A Critical Introduction and Guide. Edinburgh: Edinburgh University Press, 2013.
 James, Ian. The New French Philosophy. Cambridge: Polity, 2012.
 Kolozova, Katerina. Cut of the Real: Subjectivity in Poststructuralist Philosophy.  Columbia University Press, 2014.
 Kolozova, Katerina. The Lived Revolution: Solidarity with the Body in Pain as the New Political Universal. Evro-Balkan Press, 2010. 
 Laruelle, François, 'A Summary of Non-Philosophy' in Pli: The Warwick Journal of Philosophy. Vol. 8. Philosophies of Nature, 1999.
 Laruelle, François, 'Identity and Event' in Pli: The Warwick Journal of Philosophy. Vol. 9. Parallel Processes, 2000.
 Mullarkey, John. Post-Continental Philosophy: An Outline. Continuum Press, 2006.
 Mullarkey, John, and Anthony Paul Smith, eds. Laruelle and Non-Philosophy. Edinburgh: Edinburgh University Press, 2012. 
 Ó Maoilearca, John, All Thoughts are Equal: Laruelle and Nonhuman Philosophy, University of Minnesota Press, 2015.
 Smith, Anthony Paul. Francois Laruelle's Principles of Non Philosophy: A Critical Introduction and Guide. Edinburgh University Press, 2015.
 Smith, Anthony Paul. Laruelle: A Stranger Thought. Polity Press, 2016.

External links
 Controversy over the Possibility of a Science of Philosophy (pdf) a debate between Laruelle and Derrida (from La Décision Philosophique, No. 5, April 1988, pp. 62–76) translated by Robin Mackay
 Frequently Asked Questions at Organisation Non-Philosophique Internationale (ONPhI) (
 Organisation Non-Philosophique Internationale
 A New Presentation of Non-Philosophy by François Laruelle at Organisation Non-Philosophique Internationale (ONPhI)

Concepts in metaphilosophy